Aleksey Kolesnikov (born 17 May 1977) is a Russian swimmer. He competed in the men's 200 metre butterfly event at the 1996 Summer Olympics.

References

1977 births
Living people
Russian male swimmers
Olympic swimmers of Russia
Swimmers at the 1996 Summer Olympics
Place of birth missing (living people)